Thomas E. McCann (November 7, 1898 – March 23, 1975) was an American baseball player and coach of football and basketball. He served as the head football coach at Tusculum College in 1924 and at the University of Miami from 1931 to 1934. McCann was also the head basketball coach at Miami during the 1928–29 and 1931–32 seasons. In 1929, he was coaching football at Plant City High School in Plant City, Florida. McCann played college baseball at the University of Illinois at Urbana–Champaign in 1921 and 1922.

Head coaching record

College football

References

1898 births
1975 deaths
Baseball pitchers
Basketball coaches from Illinois
Illinois Fighting Illini baseball players
Miami Hurricanes football coaches
Miami Hurricanes men's basketball coaches
Sportspeople from Waukegan, Illinois
Tusculum Pioneers football coaches
High school football coaches in Florida